Ümit Türkoğlu (born October 22, 1981 in Izmir) is a Turkish professional basketball player who last played for Best Balıkesir of the TB2L. He played 16 times for national team.

He started his career with Tofaş S.K. in junior level. He then played for Konyaspor B.K. and Kuşadasıspor in Turkish Basketball Second League in amateur section and started his professional career with Banvit B.K. in 2004.

References

External links
Profile @ tblstat.net
Profile @ mackolik.com
Profile @ eurobasket.com
Profile @ realgm.com
Profile @ scouting4u.com

1981 births
Living people
Antalya Büyükşehir Belediyesi players
Bandırma B.İ.K. players
Best Balıkesir B.K. players
Eskişehir Basket players
Mersin Büyükşehir Belediyesi S.K. players
Sportspeople from İzmir
Turkish men's basketball players
Türk Telekom B.K. players
Centers (basketball)